Puerto Morelos is a town and seaport in Quintana Roo, Mexico's easternmost state, on the Yucatán Peninsula.

Puerto Morelos merged with the village of Leona Vicario on December 6, 2015, to become the 11th municipality in Quintana Roo, separating from its former municipality of Benito Juarez.

History
It has historically been the main port between the mainland of Yucatán and the Island of Cozumel, and an automobile ferry used to run from Puerto Morelos to Cozumel. The town is named after Independence leader José María Morelos.

Resorts are abundant in the Puerto Morelos region along the Riviera Maya and attractions, such as the Crococun Crocodile Zoo, the Botanical Garden, and a host of cenotes are also increasing in number.  Recently new smaller inns have been built which offers an evening programs of Talks on local history, marine biology, and healthy living practices.

One hundred meters off shore lies the Puerto Morelos portion of the Mesoamerican Barrier Reef System, designated as a National Marine Park in 1998 due to local environmental activists.

Geography
Puerto Morelos is divided by a highway and a mangrove swamp into three sections. The section west of the highway is known as "Colonia Joaquin Zetina Gazca". The section east of the highway is called "Colonia Pescadores". The section on the coast east of the mangrove swamp is "Puerto" or "Antiguo (old) Puerto Morelos". This original coastal fishing village is now a quiet, mixed-use neighborhood of private homes, hotels, condominiums, restaurants, and tourist shops.

The second part is about 2 km. inland and adjacent to Highway 307, on the western side. The inland portion is mainly single level dwellings for local workers. New residential developments have sprung up in recent years adding to the housing mix. There are now multi-story apartment buildings, and private residential developments between the highway and the mangrove where one can buy lots and build a house of one's own design.

Climate

Demographics
Puerto Morelos has grown rapidly with the development of tourism and as of the 2010 census is the home to 9,188 people.

Infrastructure
The marine terminal at Puerto Morelos is equipped to handle containers and is an important seaport in the state of Quintana Roo. The volume of cargo handled in the port of Puerto Morelos amounted to 41.2 thousand metric tons in 2019.

References

External links

Populated places in Quintana Roo
Port cities and towns of the Mexican Gulf Coast
Tourist attractions in Quintana Roo